Married at First Sight is an international reality television show format of Danish origin.

 Gift ved første blik, the original Danish series and other international versions
 Married at First Sight (American TV series)
 Married at First Sight (Australian TV series)
 Married at First Sight (British TV series)